Shirogane may refer to:

Places
Shirokane, a district of Minato, Tokyo, Japan
Shirogane Station, a station on the Japanese Government Railways

Characters
Takashi and Ryou Shirogane, characters from Beast King GoLion
Miyuki Shirogane, a character from Kaguya-sama: Love Is War
 Shirogane, a character in the Monochrome Factor anime series
Naoto Shirogane, a detective in Persona 4
Ryou Shirogane, a character from Tokyo Mew Mew
Shirogane, a character in the Mugen Souls series
Tsumugi Shirogane, a character in Danganronpa V3: Killing Harmony

Takashi Shirogane, a character from Voltron: Legendary Defender, based on the aforementioned Takashi Shirogane from GoLion
Himeko Shirogane, a character from Powerpuff Girls Z
Shirogane, the battle puppeteers from the anime series "Karakuri Circus"

Japanese-language surnames